Komshecheh (also known as Gomshecheh, Gomsheh, Komshehcheh, Kumsheh, Qomsheh, and Qumisheh) is a city in Habibabad District, in Borkhar County, Isfahan Province, Iran.  At the 2016 census, its population was 4,871, in 1,152 families.

Founded in 1382, it is located about 20 kilometers Northeast of Esfahan, the provincial capital, and 200 kilometers South of Qum. In addition to some pre-Islamic monuments, it is the site of Ali Abad Shahvazy castle and old town mosque and bath. Its population is 5,500. Its main economic activity consists of bread manufacturing and home baking, which employ 2,000 people, and supplies the daily bread of a population of 200,000 in the surrounding areas.

According to Iran media, the "world's largest flat bread", baked in Komeshjeh in 2008, was recorded in the Guinness Book of World Records.

References

Populated places in Borkhar County

Cities in Isfahan Province